Nera Stipičević (born 21 January 1983) is a Croatian pop singer and actress.

Nera Stipičević was born in Makarska, where she attended elementary music school. Stipičević is of Albanian origin and was a close relative of Aleksandar Stipčević. In 1993 she participated in the children's TV talent show "Turbo Limach Show", by Croatian Radiotelevision. During highschool she was into athletics, and was a member of Croatian national cadet athletic team.

She became known as one of the four last finalists in Story Supernova Music Talents, reality show aired on Nova TV in late 2003.
In 2004 she released an album called Nera which was a critical and commercial flop.

She graduated from the University of Zagreb Faculty of Economics in 2007, and in 2010 got a degree in drama at the Academy of Drama Arts in Zagreb. At the Croatian National Theatre in Zagreb, she played a role in their 2007 rendition of The Threepenny Opera by Bertold Brecht, and in their 2008 rendition of They Shoot Horses, Don't They? by Horace McCoy. For the latter role, she was nominated for a best young drama actress award at the Croatian annual drama awards 2009.

At the Croatian National Theatre in Šibenik, she co-wrote the music and acted in their 2008 play "Fantazija" by Marijana Nola, for which she was nominated for the best young operetta/musical actress award at the Croatian annual drama awards in 2008.

In 2010, she won Ples sa zvijezdama, the Croatian version of Dancing with the Stars. In the same year, she made her film debut in the Croatian movie of the omnibus Some Other Stories.

In 2015, she created a multiartistic project FreeDA dedicated to Mexican artist Frida Kahlo.

Performances

Filmography

Discography

References

External links 
 
 Some Other Stories, official page of the movie Some Other Stories
 Dirty Little Bubbles Dirty Little Bubbles
 FreeDA Project FreeDA Project

1983 births
Living people
People from Makarska
Reality television participants
21st-century Croatian women singers
Croatian pop singers
Croatian stage actresses
Croatian musical theatre actors
Croatian film actresses
Dancing with the Stars winners